The Elkhart & Western Railroad Co. , a wholly owned subsidiary of Pioneer Railcorp , is a Class III short-line railroad operating three unconnected lines in northern Indiana. The first, the Elkhart Branch, is in and around the city of Elkhart in Elkhart County, the second, the Argos Branch, radiates from Plymouth, in Marshall County, and the third, the Monon Branch, operating from Monon to Monticello, in White County.

Pioneer Railcorp created the Elkhart & Western Railroad, on May 1, 2001, from a  stretch of the Michigan Southern Railroad. The Elkhart Branch begins at its junction with the Norfolk Southern Railway near the center of Elkhart, then crosses the St. Joseph River, which it follows westward, and finally ends on the northeast side of Mishawaka, in neighboring St. Joseph County.

Freight hauled on the EWR Elkhart Line consists mainly of plastic flakes, lumber, paper and cement.
Freight hauled on the EWR Argos Line consists of mainly scrap iron, paper, plastic pellets, and lime, with the addition of storage car holding.

In January 2018, CSX sold  of track running from Monon to Monticello, to ETW. Operations began in August, serving the only customer on the line, Monticello Farm Service, Inc.

Power
The EWR received its two locomotives from Pioneer Railcorp, and although the units no longer have the Pioneer reporting marks, the units are still owned by EWR's parent.

References

External links
Elkhart and Western Railroad

Indiana railroads
Companies based in Elkhart County, Indiana
St. Joseph County, Indiana
American companies established in 2001
Pioneer Lines
Transportation in Elkhart, Indiana